The 14044 / 43 Delhi–Kotdwar Garhwal Express is an Express train belonging to Indian Railways – Northern Railway zone that runs between  & Kotdwar in India.

It operates as train number 14044 from Delhi to Kotdwar and as train number 14043 in the reverse direction serving the states of Uttarakhand, Uttar Pradesh & Delhi.

Coaches

The 14044 / 43 Delhi–Kotdwar Garhwal Express has 1 AC Chair Car 3 Second Class sitting, 6 General Unreserved & 2 SLR (seating cum luggage rake) coaches. It does not carry a pantry car.

As is customary with most train services in India, coach composition may be amended at the discretion of Indian Railways depending on demand.

Service

The 14044 Delhi–Kotdwar Garhwal Express covers the distance of 238 kilometres in 07 hours 00 mins (34.00 km/hr) & in 07 hours 05 mins as 14043 Kotdwar–Delhi Garhwal Express (33.60 km/hr).

Routeing

The 14044 / 43 Delhi–Kotdwar Garhwal Express runs from Delhi via , Hapur, Najibabad Junction to Kotdwar.

It reverses direction of travel at Gajraula Junction.

Traction

As large sections of the route are yet to be electrified, Tughlakabad or Ludhiana-based WDM-2 or WDM-3A locomotives haul the train for its entire journey.

Timings

14044 Delhi–Kotdwar Garhwal Express leaves Delhi on a daily basis at 07:20 hrs IST and reaches Kotdwar at 14:20 hrs IST the same day.

14043 Kotdwar–Delhi Garhwal Express leaves Kotdwar on a daily basis at 15:10 hrs IST and reaches  at 22:15 hrs IST the same day.

References 

 https://www.youtube.com/watch?v=H7x8mY2m2Kc
 https://www.flickr.com/photos/67203630@N04/8743702827/
 http://pib.nic.in/newsite/erelease.aspx?relid=87360

External links

Transport in Delhi
Named passenger trains of India
Rail transport in Delhi
Rail transport in Uttar Pradesh
Rail transport in Uttarakhand
Express trains in India